Pierre Charras (19 March 1945 – 19 January 2014) was a French writer, actor and translator from English to French. He published several novels including Monsieur Henri, Prix des Deux Magots (1995), Juste avant la nuit (1998), Comédien (2000) and Dix-neuf secondes, prix du roman FNAC 2003.

He is buried at the Père Lachaise cemetery (53rd division).

Filmography

Theatre 
 1973 : J'ai confiance dans mon pays by Alain Scoff, directed by the author, Théâtre Mouffetard
 1986 : La Comédie sans titre by Italo Svevo, directed by Jacques Mauclair, Théâtre du Marais

Adaptation
 1982 : Une fille drôlement gonflée by Ray Cooney and Gene Stone, adaptation in collaboration with Alain Scoff, directed by Francis Joffo, Théâtre de la Potinière

Published books 

Other publishers :

External links 
 « Pierre Charras est mort : l'auteur de "Monsieur Henri" et "Dix-neuf secondes" avait 68 ans. Bonne nuit Pierre Charras », par Odile Quirot sur bibliobs.nouvelobs.com, 21 janvier 2014] 
 
 

20th-century French writers
20th-century French male writers
French male actors
English–French translators
Prix des Deux Magots winners
1945 births
Writers from Saint-Étienne
2014 deaths
Burials at Père Lachaise Cemetery
French male non-fiction writers
20th-century French translators
Actors from Saint-Étienne